Anandra albomarginata is a species of beetle in the family Cerambycidae. It was described by Maurice Pic in 1927.

References

Agapanthiini
Beetles described in 1927